Speranza simplex is a species of geometrid moth in the family Geometridae. It is found in North America.

The MONA or Hodges number for Speranza simplex is 6281.

References

Further reading

 

Macariini
Articles created by Qbugbot
Moths described in 1907